Kalle Aalto (22 February 1884 – 14 December 1950) was a Finnish politician. He worked as a mason and builder and later as farmer. Aalto was born and died in Halikko. He become a member of the Parliament of Finland from the constituency of Turku Province South on 16 October 1919, after Sikstus Rönnberg had died. He was a Social Democrat, and served in the parliament till 1922.

References
 

1884 births
1950 deaths
People from Salo, Finland
People from Turku and Pori Province (Grand Duchy of Finland)
Social Democratic Party of Finland politicians
Members of the Parliament of Finland (1919–22)